S.S. Virtus Lanciano 1924 is an Italian association football club, based in Lanciano, Abruzzo. It last played in Serie B in 2015–16 as Virtus Lanciano. Virtus Lanciano now competes in youth football only.

History

The club was founded in 1919 and refounded in 2008 with the name S.S. Virtus Lanciano 1924. That year S.S. Lanciano S.r.l. bankrupted; a new company S.S. Virtus Lanciano 1924 acquired the sports title by using the Article 52 of N.O.I.F.

In the season 2011–12 it was promoted to Serie B for the first time under the guidance of Carmine Gautieri, who also led the team to its debut season in the second tier, ended in a safe mid-table position.

Virtus Lanciano gained national news in end-2013 after the club, now headed by Marco Baroni, surprised the whole country by leading the league table undefeated, against all odds, by the end of October.

The club ended the 2015–16 season with relegation, and successively renounced to register for the new Lega Pro season due to financial and administrative issues. The first team was excluded altogether from the Italian football league pyramid.

As of 2020–21 season, Virtus Lanciano still runs their youth teams, and have derbies with the illegitimate successor, Lanciano 1920.

Illegitimate phoenix club
After Virtus Lanciano was withdrew from the Italian football pyramid, another club, A.S.D. Marcianese, renamed itself as A.S.D. Lanciano Calcio 1920. That club claimed as a phoenix club of Virtus Lanciano.

That club promoted from Prima Categoria to Promozione and then Eccellenza Abruzzo in 2019.

Colors and badge
The team's official colors are red and black.

Notable former players

 Alessio Cragno (2016)

Managers
 Fabrizio Castori (1998–99), (2000–03)
 Maurizio Pellegrino (2004–05)
 Francesco Monaco (2005–06)
 Andrea Camplone (2006–07)
 Francesco Moriero (2007–08)
 Eusebio Di Francesco (2008–09)
 Dino Pagliari (2009–10)
 Andrea Camplone (2010–11)
 Carmine Gautieri (2011–13)
 Marco Baroni (2013–14)
 Roberto D'Aversa (2014–16)
 Primo Maragliulo (2016)

References

Football clubs in Abruzzo
Association football clubs established in 1924
Serie B clubs
Serie C clubs
Serie D clubs
Eccellenza
Promozione
Phoenix clubs (association football)
1924 establishments in Italy
Companies based in the Province of Chieti